Zygon: Journal of Religion & Science is a quarterly peer-reviewed academic journal covering religion and science published by Wiley-Blackwell. It was established in 1966 and the editor-in-chief is Arthur C. Petersen (University College London). Zygon is sponsored by the Institute on Religion in an Age of Science and the Center for Advanced Study in Religion and Science (CASIRAS).

The name "Zygon" (mod. L., ad. ζυγόν Gr. yoke.), according to the journal founder Ralph Wendell Burhoe, is the Greek term for anything that joins two bodies, especially the yoking or harnessing of a team that must pull together effectively. The Zygon is the symbol of the journal, its aim being to reunite the "split team" of values and knowledge.

According to the Journal Citation Reports, the journal has a 2016 impact factor of 0.617, ranking it 31st out of 41 journals (Q4) in the category "Social Issues".

References

External links 
 
 Center for Advanced Studies in Religion and Science

Religious studies journals
Publications established in 1966
Religion and science
Wiley-Blackwell academic journals
English-language journals